Borana or Borena may refer to:

 Borana Oromo people, a moiety of the Oromo people
 Borana language, a language spoken by the Borana people
 Borena Zone, one of the 17 zones of the Oromia Region of Ethiopia
 Borena National Park, a national park in Oromia Region
 Borena Sayint National Park, a protected area in Ethiopia's Amhara Region

Language and nationality disambiguation pages